This list is a categorization of the most common food components based on their macronutrients. Macronutrients can refer to the chemical substances that humans consume in the largest quantities (See Nutrient)

Macronutrients that provide energy
There are three principal classes of macronutrients: carbohydrate, protein, and fat. Macronutrients are defined as a class of chemical compounds which humans consume in relatively large quantities compared to vitamins and minerals, and which provide humans with energy.

Water makes up a large proportion of the total mass ingested as part of a normal diet, but it does not provide any nutritional value. Ethanol provides calories, but there is no requirement for ethanol as an essential nutrient.

Carbohydrates
Glucose
Sucrose
Ribose
Amylose (a major component of starch)
Amylopectin
Maltose
Galactose
Fructose
Lactose

Protein
Essential and non-essential amino acids
 Alanine
 Arginine
  Aspartic acid (aspartate)
 Asparagine
 Cysteine
  Glutamic acid (glutamate)
 Glutamine
 Glycine
 Histidine
 Isoleucine
 Leucine
 Lysine
 Methionine
 Phenylalanine
 Proline
 Serine
 Threonine
 Tryptophan
Tyrosine
 Valine

Fats

Saturated (i.e., stable) fatty acids
 Acetic acid (C2)
 Propionic acid (C3)
 Butyric acid (C4)
 Valeric acid (C5)
 Caproic acid (C6)
 Caprylic acid (C8)
 Capric acid (C10)
 Lauric acid (C12)
 Myristic acid (C14)
 Pentadecanoic acid (C15)
 Palmitic acid (C16)
 Margaric acid (C17)
 Stearic acid (C18)
 Arachidic acid (C20)
 Behenic acid (C22)
 Lignoceric acid (C24)
 Cerotic acid (C26)

Monounsaturated (i.e., semi-stable) fatty acids
 Myristoleic acid
 Oleic acid
 Eicosenoic acids
 Erucic acid
 Nervonic acid

Polyunsaturated (i.e., unstable) fatty acids
 Linoleic acid (LA) - an essential fatty acid
 α-Linolenic acid (ALA) - an essential fatty acid
 Stearidonic acid (SDA)
 Gamma-Linolenic acid (GLA)
 Arachidonic acid (AA)
 Eicosatetraenoic acid (ETA)
 Timnodonic acid (EPA) 
 Clupanodonic acid (DPA)
 Cervonic acid (DHA)

Essential fatty acids
 α-Linolenic acid ALA (18:3) omega-3 fatty acid
  Linoleic acid LA (18:2) omega-6 fatty acid

Macronutrients that do not provide energy

Oxygen
Oxygen is essential for life.

Water
Water is also essential for life. It provides the medium in which all metabolic processes proceed. It is necessary for the absorption of macronutrients and micronutrients, but it provides no nutritional energy.

Fiber
Dietary fiber from fruits, vegetables and grain foods. Insoluble dietary fiber is not absorbed in the human digestive tract, but is important in maintaining the bulk of a bowel movement to avoid constipation. Soluble fiber can be metabolized by bacteria residing in the large intestine. Soluble fiber is marketed as serving a prebiotic function with claims for promoting "healthy" intestinal bacteria. Bacterial metabolism of soluble fiber also produces short-chain fatty acids like butyric acid, which may be absorbed into intestinal cells as a source of food energy.

 cellulose
 methyl cellulose
 hemicellulose
 lignans
 plant waxes
 resistant starches
 beta-glucans
 pectins
 natural gums
 inulin
 oligosaccharides

See also
Nutrient
Essential nutrient
List of micronutrients
List of phytochemicals in food

References

Macronutrients

External links

 What are Macronutrients, Health Science

Nutrition